Tucker & Dale vs. Evil is a 2010 black comedy horror film directed by Eli Craig and written by Craig and Morgan Jurgenson. It stars Tyler Labine, Alan Tudyk, Katrina Bowden, Brandon Jay McLaren, Jesse Moss, and Chelan Simmons. Labine and Tudyk play a pair of well-meaning hillbillies who are mistaken for killers by a group of clueless college students. The film premiered at the 2010 Sundance Film Festival and received a limited release in the United States.

Plot

The movie begins with a reporter and cameraman being murdered before the movie goes back in time.

Allison, Chad, Chloe, Chuck, Jason, Naomi, Todd, Mitch, and Mike are college kids going camping in West Virginia. While at a gas station, they encounter Tucker and Dale, two well-meaning hillbillies who have just bought the vacation home of their dreams: a run-down lakefront cabin, deep in the woods. On Tucker's advice, Dale tries to talk to Allison, but because of his inferiority complex and appearance, he only scares her and her friends. On the way to the cabin that Tucker has recently bought, they are pulled over by Sheriff Gurr, who warns them of the dangers of the area.

Tucker and Dale arrive at their decrepit cabin and begin repairing it. Nearby in the woods, Chad tells a story about the "Memorial Day Massacre", a hillbilly attack which took place 20 years ago. The college kids go skinny-dipping where Tucker and Dale are fishing, and Allison, startled, hits her head. Tucker and Dale save her from drowning, but her friends mistake them abducting her. When Allison wakes up in Tucker and Dale's cabin the next day, she is initially scared but gradually befriends them. The other college kids arrive at the cabin to save Allison from her "psychopathic captors", and Chuck runs away to get the police. While Dale and Allison are inside the cabin, hornets attack Tucker as he accidentally cuts a hive, causing him to frantically wave his chainsaw around, which the college kids misinterpret as hostility. They scatter through the woods, where Mitch accidentally impales himself on a broken tree, killing himself. After finding Mitch's body, Chad persuades the others that they are in a battle for survival.

Allison's friends follow Tucker and Dale back to their cabin and see Allison helping out with construction of an outhouse, but they assume she is being made to dig her own grave. The college kids attack, but Todd accidentally impales himself on his own spear when attacking Dale, and Mike falls into a  wood chipper while lunging for Tucker, who bent down to pick some more wood. Allison is accidentally knocked unconscious by Dale's shovel during the attack, and he takes her inside. The other kids assume the hillbillies killed the two when they see Tucker trying to save Mike from the wood chipper. Tucker and Dale think the college kids are a part of a suicide pact, and that contacting the police will make them murder suspects. Chuck arrives back with Sheriff Gurr, who expresses doubt over Tucker and Dale's suicide-pact theory. Gurr goes inside the cabin and accidentally kills himself with a loose beam, then Chuck dies trying to threaten the hillbillies with the gun, only to shoot himself. Chad reappears and attempts to shoot Tucker and Dale, but only manages to capture Tucker, who was retrieving Dale's pet Jangers, whom he ties upside down to a tree. Chad then tortures Tucker and cuts off two of his fingers, sending them with a message to Dale, in an attempt to draw him out.

Dale leaves to rescue Tucker while Chad and Naomi return to the cabin to save Allison. When Allison tries to explain the situation, they accuse her of having Stockholm syndrome. Tucker and Dale return, and Allison attempts to lead a calm discussion. Chad says his grandmother told him that his father was killed in the Memorial Day Massacre, and his mother was the lone survivor. Jason and Chloe break in to retrieve Allison, and a fire breaks out. Tucker, Dale, and Allison escape; Naomi, Chloe, and Jason die, and Chad, who is now insane and scarred, vows revenge. After crashing their truck, an injured Tucker tells Dale that Chad has taken Allison to an old sawmill. At the sawmill, Chad ties Allison to a log and sets it to convey into the saw. Dale arrives and rescues Allison, and the two barricade themselves inside an upstairs office where they discover news clippings revealing Chad's father to be one of the hillbillies responsible for the massacre 20 years ago, and not one of the victims. Chad becomes enraged, but Dale throws a box of chamomile tea at Chad, giving him an asthma attack. Chad convulses and falls out of a window to his apparent death.

The police and a news crew arrive late at the cabin and broadcast a news report stating that the deaths appear to be the result of a suicide pact and a deranged killer, who is revealed to be Chad, has survived the fall. The reporter and cameraman are the same two from the movie's opening scene. Tucker watches the report on the news while convalescing in the hospital. Dale enters and they discuss Tucker's recovery. Tucker asks Dale whether he managed to invite Allison on a date and is happy to hear the two of them are going bowling. Later that night at the bowling alley, Dale encourages a fellow hillbilly to talk to some girls and to "just be himself".  As Dale and Allison confess their feelings for each other and kiss, the other hillbilly accidentally knocks out a girl in the background, starting a new misunderstanding.

Cast
 Tyler Labine as Dale Dobson, a timid, unsure, but good-natured hillbilly who falls in love with Allison.
 Alan Tudyk as Tucker McGee, property owner of the run-down cabin and Dale's well-meaning friend.
 Katrina Bowden as Allison, a beautiful, level-headed psychology student. She initially is terrified of Dale based on first impression but soon falls in love with him for his gentle and sweet nature. 
 Jesse Moss as Chad, the group 'leader' and the film's main antagonist. A mentally deranged college student with a ton of psychotic tendencies and a specific prejudice towards hillbillies. 
 Chelan Simmons as Chloe
 Philip Granger as Sheriff Gurr
 Brandon Jay McLaren as Jason
 Christie Laing as Naomi
 Travis Nelson as Chuck
 Alex Arsenault as Todd
 Adam Beauchesne as Mitch
 Joseph Allan Sutherland as Mike
 Karen Reigh as Cheryl
 Tye Evans as Chad's Dad
 Weezer as Jangers the Dog

The film's director, Eli Craig, and his wife Sasha have brief roles at the beginning and the end of the movie as a cameraman and reporter respectively.

Production
The production began in June 2009 with the casting of the actors. Principal photography started one month later in Calgary, Alberta. In October 2009, post production ensued in British Columbia, and the first images were released as part of the American Film Market.

Reception

Box office
The film premiered on 22 January 2010 at Sundance Film Festival and was on 12 March 2010 part of the SXSW Film Festival. The film was distributed by Magnolia and received a limited theatrical release in the US on 30 September 2011. On its opening weekend, the film grossed $52,843 from 30 theaters. It grossed $223,838 in the US. It grossed between $5 and $5.3 million outside the US.

Critical response
Rotten Tomatoes, a review aggregator, reports that 85% of 115 surveyed critics gave the film a positive review; the average rating is 6.90 out of 10. The critical consensus states, "Like the best horror/comedies, Tucker & Dale vs. Evil mines its central crazy joke for some incredible scares, laughs, and—believe it or not—heart". The film also has a score of 65 out of 100 on Metacritic based on 23 reviews, indicating "generally favorable reviews".

Todd Gilchrist of Shock Till You Drop wrote, "Eli Craig's feature debut celebrates genre conventions while turning the traditional view of horror-movie heroes and villains upside down." Roger Ebert also gave the film a positive review, writing, "Students of the Little Movie Glossary may find it funny how carefully "Tucker and Dale" works its way through upended cliches".  Noel Murray of The A.V. Club rated it C+ and called it "surprisingly clever" but "too slick and too cute".  Dennis Harvey of Variety wrote that the film "offers good-natured, confidently executed splatstick whose frequent hilarity suffers only from peaking too early."

Accolades

Proposed sequel

In an interview with Choice Cuts, director Eli Craig expressed thoughts on a sequel titled Tucker and Dale Go To Yale and described it as "Good Will Hunting meets Texas Chainsaw Massacre". In that same interview, Craig also liked Alan Tudyk's idea of doing a sequel that was similar to From Dusk till Dawn.

At HorrorHound Weekend 2014, cast members Tyler Labine and Alan Tudyk confirmed that a sequel is in development. In 2016, the two revealed that they are still actively developing the project despite other commitments.  When asked of the status of the sequel at Boston Comic Con 2017, Alan Tudyk responded that a script had been written but was disappointing and unlikely to be moving forward.

References

External links
 
 
 
 

2010 films
2010 comedy horror films
2010 independent films
American comedy horror films
American independent films
American slasher films
Canadian comedy horror films
Canadian independent films
Canadian slasher films
English-language Canadian films
Films about vacationing
Films set in West Virginia
Parodies of horror
Slasher comedy films
2010s English-language films
2010s Canadian films
2010s American films
Films about hillbillies